Craig Atkins (born 29 May 1966) was an Australian cricketer. He was a left-handed batsman and left-arm slow bowler who played for Northamptonshire. He was born in Melbourne.

Atkins made his Second XI debut for the side during the 1990 season, though he did not make another appearance in the competition until 1994, when he played for Essex Second XI. The following month, he also played in matches for Hampshire, Leicestershire, and Northamptonshire Second XI teams.

Receiving British citizenship in early 1995, Atkins was signed to a one-year deal with Northamptonshire in February 1995. During the 1995 season, Atkins made his only first-class appearance, against Surrey. From the tailend, he scored 5 runs in the first innings in which he batted, and 8 not out in the second. From 11 overs of bowling, he took figures of 1–46, his only wicket being that of Mark Butcher.

Atkins made a single List A appearance in the same season, though he did not bat in the match.

Between 1997 and 1998, Atkins played for Cumberland in the Minor Counties Championship and MCC Trophy.

References

External links
Craig Atkins at Cricket Archive 

1966 births
Living people
Australian cricketers
Northamptonshire cricketers
Cumberland cricketers
Cricketers from Melbourne